Thame United Football Club are a football club based in Thame, Oxfordshire, England. They were established in 1883 and joined the Hellenic League in 1959.

History
Thame United were formed in 1883, making them one of Oxfordshire's oldest clubs. They spent their early years playing in local Oxfordshire leagues.  In 1959 they stepped up to the Hellenic League, where they were league champions in 1961–62 and 1969–70 and runners-up on three other occasions.

In 1988 the decision was taken to switch to the South Midlands League. In three seasons in this league United finished runners-up twice and then claimed the league title in 1990–91, which saw them promoted to the Isthmian League Division Three. Two promotions followed in quick succession, putting the club in Division One in 1995. Although United were relegated in 1998, they bounced straight back the following season under manager Andy Sinnott, who also led them to the semi-finals of the FA Vase and to within two points of achieving promotion to the Premier Division.

In October 2003 the club reached the fourth qualifying round of the FA Cup for the first time in their history, going down 2–1 to Conference side Farnborough Town. Since then they have reached this point in the competition twice, losing 1–0 to Hornchurch and 5–0 to Forest Green. In 2004, due to non-league reorganisation, United switched to the Southern League Division One West.

In 2005 severe financial difficulties hit the club, with bailiffs seizing assets to offset unpaid VAT bills, and the landlord of their Windmill Road stadium serving them with notice of eviction. The club managed to limp to the end of the season playing at the ground of neighbours Aylesbury United and a rock-bottom finish saw them relegated back to the Hellenic League after 18 years away.

During the summer of 2006, Aylesbury were also evicted from their ground, leaving Thame homeless once again, leading to a new groundshare arrangement with AFC Wallingford. The results on the playing field continued to be poor, and they completed the 2006–07 season in a relegation position despite the improvement of results following the return of successful manager Mark West. Because of this, they were relegated to the Hellenic Football League Division 1 East for the 2007–08 season. 

In October 2007 it was announced that the club planned to move to a multi-million pound venue at Church Farm in the North of Thame.  They hoped to begin playing in their new stadium by the 2009–10 season, but as of October 2010 the stadium was still being built. After the stadium was completed, a game to celebrate the club's new stadium was played against Football League Two side Oxford United in January 2011. Thame lost 3–1 with the new ASM Stadium's first attendance of 1,381.  At the end of the 2016–17 season, the club was promoted to the Southern League in Step 4 of the National League System under manager Mark West after a final day on which the "Red Kites" beat Henley Town 9–0.  In their first Southern League game in decades, Thame came from behind to beat Chalfont St. Peter 2–1.
In 2021 Thame United and Thame Boys / Girls merged. Richard Carr became chairman of Thame United with Jake Collinge taking on the role as Vice Chairman.

Management team
 Manager – Mark West
 Assistant Manager – Stuart Blaik
 First Team Coach – Ben Johnson
 Physio – Jen Pilcher

Staff
 Chairman – Richard Carr
 Vice Chairman Jack Collinge
 Groundsman Contractor
 Kit / Turnstiles – Available
 Photographer & Social Media – Simon Godfrey
 Hospitality – Mark Hurley

Current squad

Stadium
Thame United play their home games at The ASM Stadium located at Meadow View Park, Thame. Construction on the ground commenced in March 2010 at a cost of £3.1m, the team moving in to the ground in December 2010. 
From the 2015–16 season, Aylesbury United signed a two-year deal to groundshare with Thame United.

The 20-acre site is also home to a number of local youth and community teams, 7 pitches including multiple artificial turf training pitches, club bar and function rooms.

Club records
Best league performance: 4th in Isthmian League Division 1, 1999–2000
Best FA Cup performance: 4th qualifying round, 2003–04, 2004–05
Best FA Trophy performance: 3rd round, 2002–03
Best FA Vase performance: Semi-finals, 1998–99
Record attendance (club): 1,382 vs Oxford United, official ground opening, January 2011
Record attendance (ground): 1,904 Long Crendon vs Wycombe Wanderers, Berks & Bucks Senior Cup quarter-final, 15 February 2022

Honours

League
Hellenic League Premier Division Champions 2016–17
Hellenic League Champions – 1961–62 and 1969–70
South Midlands Premier Division Champions – 1990–91
Isthmian League Division Two Champions – 1994–95

Cup
Oxfordshire FA Senior Cup Winners – 1906, 1909, 1910, 1976, 1981, 1993, 2001, 2002
Oxfordshire Intermediate Cup Winners – 1977, 1979, 1992, 1996, 2000, 2003, 2014

References

Sources

External links
Club website

Hellenic Football League
Association football clubs established in 1883
Football clubs in Oxfordshire
Southern Football League clubs
Isthmian League
1883 establishments in England
Football clubs in England
Thame